Darling is an Italian sun care company founded in 2018.

History
Darling was founded in 2018 by Alberto Giacobazzi and Ilenia Gebennini in Modena, Italy. The slogan of the company is a play on the acronym SPF, which they state stands for "stay pretty forever". Its products are available over the Internet, and initially in physical stores in Europe, the Middle East, and the United States.

Sun care
Darling has sun care lotions with SPF protection, tan "enhancers", and items for post sun exposure use. SPF levels range from 20 to 50. Each of their lotions are vegan and paraben-free, and ingredients include vitamin E and anti-oxidants. The scent used in Darling lotions—Monoi de Tahiti—emanates from an oil imported from Polynesia, which is made of coconut oil, the pulp of sun-dried walnuts, and macerated with tiarè flowers. Other ingredients include aloe vera, allantoin, horsetail, apricot oil, jojoba oil, blueberry extract, and chamomile. All ingredients are either ecologically friendly or recyclable.

References

2018 establishments in Italy
Companies based in Modena
Sunscreen brands